Ruatuna in Matakohe, New Zealand is a house built from kauri timber in 1877 overlooking the Kaipara Harbour. The house is the birthplace of Gordon Coates (1878–1943) who served as Prime Minister of New Zealand from 1925 to 1928. Ruatuna was registered by the New Zealand Historic Places Trust (now called Heritage New Zealand) on 23 June 1983 and has registration number 7. The building has a category I listing.

References

Houses completed in 1877
Kaipara District
Heritage New Zealand Category 1 historic places in the Northland Region
History of the Northland Region
1870s architecture in New Zealand
Buildings and structures in the Northland Region
1877 establishments in New Zealand